Antonio Mionić (born 31 May 2001) is a Croatian professional footballer who plays as a midfielder for  club Alessandria, on loan from AC Milan.

Club career
A former youth academy player of Istra 1961, Mionić moved to AC Milan in 2018. On 30 October 2019, he extended his contract with the club until June 2023.

In August 2021, Mionić joined Serie C club Montevarchi on a season long loan deal. He made his professional debut on 5 September 2021 in a 3–1 league win against Virtus Entella. In September 2022, he joined Alessandria for a one-year loan until the end of the season, with an option to be signed permanently.

International career
Mionić is a Croatian youth international.

Career statistics

References

External links
 

2001 births
Living people
Sportspeople from Pula
Association football midfielders
Croatian footballers
Croatia youth international footballers
NK Istra 1961 players
Serie C players
A.C. Milan players
Montevarchi Calcio Aquila 1902 players
U.S. Alessandria Calcio 1912 players
Croatian expatriate footballers
Croatian expatriate sportspeople in Italy
Expatriate footballers in Italy